Pelidnota is a genus of beetles of the family Scarabaeidae.

Subgenus and species
Species within this genus include:

 Subgenus Pelidnota 
 Pelidnota notata-Group
 Pelidnota aeruginosa (Linnaeus, 1758)
 Pelidnota alliacea (Germar, 1824)
 Pelidnota ancilla F. Bates, 1904
 Pelidnota aurescens H. Bates, 1888
 Pelidnota caesarea (Gistel, 1857)
 Pelidnota centroamericana Ohaus, 1913
 Pelidnota chalcothorax Perty, 1834
 Pelidnota chiriquina F. Bates, 1904
 Pelidnota chlorana Erichson, 1847
 Pelidnota costaricensis H. Bates, 1888
 Pelidnota doblerae Frey, 1967
 Pelidnota fallax Gistel, 1857
 Pelidnota fracida F. Bates, 1904
 Pelidnota frommeri Hardy, 1975
 Pelidnota fulva Blanchard, 1850
 Pelidnota guatemalensis H. Bates, 1888
 Pelidnota huetheri Howden, 1998
 Pelidnota jalapensis H. Bates, 1888
 Pelidnota laevissima Burmeister, 1855
 Pelidnota lucae LeConte, 1863
 Pelidnota lugubris LeConte, 1874
 Pelidnota luridipes Blanchard, 1850
 Pelidnota notata Blanchard, 1850
 Pelidnota pallidipennis F. Bates, 1904
 Pelidnota parallela Hardy, 1975
 Pelidnota perplexa Hardy, 1975
 Pelidnota prasina Burmeister, 1844
 Pelidnota prolixa Sharp, 1877
 Pelidnota punctata (Linnaeus, 1758)
 Pelidnota punctulata H. Bates, 1888
 Pelidnota runica (Gistel, 1850)
 Pelidnota sordida (Germar, 1824)
 Pelidnota strigosa Laporte de Castelnau, 1840
 Pelidnota teocuitlamayatli Delgado et al., 1988
 Pelidnota tolimana Ohaus, 1935
 Pelidnota tristis (Gistel, 1850)
 Pelidnota unicolor (Drury, 1778)
 Pelidnota virescens Burmeister, 1844
 Pelidnota lucida-Group
 Pelidnota fuscoviridis Ohaus, 1913
 Pelidnota lucida Burmeister, 1844
 Pelidnota polita (Latreille, 1811)
 Pelidnota burmeisteri-Group
 Pelidnota burmeisteri Burmeister, 1844
 Pelidnota cyanitarsis (Gory, 1833)
 Pelidnota egregia Frey, 1967
 Pelidnota langsdorffi (Mannerheim, 1829)
 Pelidnota ludovici Ohaus, 1905
 Pelidnota luxuriosa Blackwelder, 1944
 Subgenus Odontognathus Laporte de Castelnau
 Pelidnota (Odontognathus) pulchella-Group
 Pelidnota acutipennis F. Bates, 1904
 Pelidnota adrianae Martinez, 1982
 Pelidnota belti Sharp, 1877
 Pelidnota cupripes Perty, 1832
 Pelidnota discicollis Ohaus, 1912
 Pelidnota dubia F. Bates, 1904
 Pelidnota gabrielae Martinez, 1979
 Pelidnota glaberrima Blanchard, 1850
 Pelidnota impressicollis Ohaus, 1925
 Pelidnota labyrinthophallica Solis & Morón, 1994
 Pelidnota nadiae Martinez, 1978
 Pelidnota plicipennis Ohaus, 1934
 Pelidnota pubes Ohaus, 1913
 Pelidnota pulchella (Kirby, 1818)
 Pelidnota purpurea Burmeister, 1844
 Pelidnota santidomini Ohaus, 1905
 Pelidnota similis Ohaus, 1908
 Pelidnota soederstroemi Ohaus, 1908
 Pelidnota striatopunctata (Kirsch, 1885)
 Pelidnota testaceovirens Blanchard, 1850
 Pelidnota xanthopyga Hardy, 1975
 Pelidnota xanthospila Germar, 1824
 Pelidnota yungana Ohaus, 1934
 Pelidnota (Odontognathus) ebenina-Group
 Pelidnota ebenina (Blanchard, 1842)
 Pelidnota gounellei Ohaus, 1908
 Pelidnota (Odontognathus) nitescens-Group
 Pelidnota nitescens Vigors, 1825
 Pelidnota (Odontognathus) quadripunctata-Group
 Pelidnota quadripunctata F. Bates, 1904
 Pelidnota (Odontognathus) cuprea-Group
 Pelidnota cuprea Germar, 1824
 Pelidnota vitalisi Ohaus, 1925
 Pelidnota (Odontognathus) rubripennis-Group
 Pelidnota riedeli (Ohaus, 1905)
 Pelidnota rubripennis (Burmeister, 1844)
 Pelidnota (Odontognathus) gracilis-Group
 Pelidnota gracilis (Gory, 1834)
 Pelidnota tibialis Burmeister, 1844
 Pelidnota (Odontognathus) liturella-Group
 Pelidnota assumpta Ohaus, 1928
 Pelidnota bivittata (Swederus, 1788)
 Pelidnota boyi Ohaus, 1928
 Pelidnota crassipes Ohaus, 1905
 Pelidnota flavovittata Perty, 1832
 Pelidnota fusciventris Ohaus, 1905
 Pelidnota liturella (Kirby, 1818)
 Pelidnota matogrossensis Frey, 1976
 Pelidnota ohausi Frey, 1976
 Pelidnota sericeicollis Frey, 1976
 Pelidnota uncinata Ohaus, 1930
 Pelidnota vitticollis Burmeister, 1844
 Pelidnota zikani Ohaus, 1922
 Subgenus Chalcoplethis Burmeister
 Pelidnota (Chalcoplethis) rugulosa-Group
 Pelidnota glabra Ohaus, 1922
 Pelidnota instabilis Ohaus, 1912
 Pelidnota jolyi Martinez, 1982
 Pelidnota rubriventris Blanchard, 1850
 Pelidnota rugulosa Burmeister, 1844
 Pelidnota subandina Ohaus, 1905
 Pelidnota (Chalcoplethis) granulata-Group
 Pelidnota bahiana Ohaus, 1905
 Pelidnota chamaeleon (Herbst, 1789)
 Pelidnota chibchana Ohaus, 1912
 Pelidnota cyanipes (Kirby, 1818)
 Pelidnota granulata
 Pelidnota hoefigi Ohaus, 1912
 Pelidnota kirschi F. Bates, 1904
 Pelidnota viridicuprea Ohaus, 1908
 Pelidnota (Chalcoplethis) kirbyi-Group
 Pelidnota aciculata (F. Bates, 1904)
 Pelidnota kirbyi (Gray, 1832)
 Pelidnota richteri Ohaus, 1910
 Pelidnota sanctijacobi Ohaus, 1905
 Pelidnota seriatopunctata Ohaus, 1912
 Pelidnota velutipes (Arrow, 1900)
 Subgenus unknown:
 Pelidnota abracadabra
 Pelidnota acconciai
 Pelidnota agnesae
 Pelidnota alutacea
 Pelidnota angiae
 Pelidnota arnaudi
 Pelidnota beniouioui
 Pelidnota beraudi
 Pelidnota bertrandi
 Pelidnota bleuzeni
 Pelidnota bondili
 Pelidnota boulangeri
 Pelidnota brusteli
 Pelidnota carlettii
 Pelidnota cayennensis
 Pelidnota cerdai
 Pelidnota chalcopus
 Pelidnota championi
 Pelidnota chiapasensis
 Pelidnota chimborazoensis
 Pelidnota chiriquicola
 Pelidnota courtini
 Pelidnota cribrata
 Pelidnota degallieri
 Pelidnota drumonti
 Pelidnota durantonorum
 Pelidnota egana
 Pelidnota emerita
 Pelidnota equatoriana
 Pelidnota estebanabadiei
 Pelidnota estebandurani
 Pelidnota fabricelavalettei
 Pelidnota filippiniae
 Pelidnota genieri
 Pelidnota gilletti
 Pelidnota girardi
 Pelidnota grangesi
 Pelidnota grossiorum
 Pelidnota gwendolinae
 Pelidnota herbacea
 Pelidnota hernanlequericai
 Pelidnota hirsutiphallica
 Pelidnota incerta
 Pelidnota kucerai
 Pelidnota lacazei
 Pelidnota lavalettei
 Pelidnota louzadai
 Pelidnota malyi
 Pelidnota mantillerii
 Pelidnota mezai
 Pelidnota micobalaguerae
 Pelidnota neitamorenoi
 Pelidnota osculatii
 Pelidnota paraguayensis
 Pelidnota parvasedmagnifica
 Pelidnota pennata
 Pelidnota peslieri
 Pelidnota planipennis
 Pelidnota porioni
 Pelidnota punctata 
 Pelidnota raingeardi
 Pelidnota recondita
 Pelidnota rivascanteroi
 Pelidnota rostrata
 Pelidnota rouchei
 Pelidnota sanctidomini
 Pelidnota satipoensis
 Pelidnota schneideri
 Pelidnota semiaurata
 Pelidnota sikorskii
 Pelidnota simoensi
 Pelidnota sumptuosa
 Pelidnota texensis
 Pelidnota thiliezi
 Pelidnota toulgoeti
 Pelidnota touroulti
 Pelidnota ulianai
 Pelidnota ustarani
 Pelidnota vanderberghi
 Pelidnota vazdemelloi
 Pelidnota versicolor
 Pelidnota villavicencioensis
 Pelidnota werneri
 Pelidnota yungasensis
 Pelidnota zovii

References

Scarabaeidae